Alex (born April 20, 1976) is a former Brazilian football player.

Club career
Alex joined newly was promoted to J2 League club, Oita Trinita in 1999. On March 14, he debuted in J2 against Consadole Sapporo in opening game in 1999 season. He played 11 matches and Trinita finished at the 3rd place in 1999 season. He left the club end of 1999 season.

Club statistics

References

External links

plaza.rakuten.co.jp

1976 births
Living people
Brazilian footballers
Brazilian expatriate footballers
J2 League players
Oita Trinita players
Association football forwards
Expatriate footballers in Japan